The following events occurred in April 1925:

April 1, 1925 (Wednesday)
The Hebrew University of Jerusalem opened.
Anadolu Sigorta, the first national insurance company of Turkey, was established.

April 2, 1925 (Thursday)
France and Turkey agreed on the autonomy of Alexandretta.
Born: Hard Boiled Haggerty, American professional wrestler and actor (d. 2004)

April 3, 1925 (Friday)
The Ulster Unionist Party won the Northern Ireland general election.
The British government repealed the Reparation Recovery Act, which had placed import duties on German goods as a means of recovering reparations payments.
Henry Ford began running a private air freight service between Detroit and Chicago.
Born: Tony Benn, politician, in London (d. 2014)

April 4, 1925 (Saturday)
Retired 77-year-old Field Marshal Paul von Hindenburg agreed to run in the second round of the German presidential election in the place of Karl Jarres, who had won the first round.
The Australian state of Western Australia held a referendum on prohibition. The proposal for prohibition was defeated.
Born: Fariza Magomadova, Chechen education pioneer, in Chechen Autonomous Oblast (alive in 2021)

April 5, 1925 (Sunday)
The Belgian Labour Party won the general election in Belgium.
The Miami tornado struck Dade County, Florida.
The Swedish Bandy Association formed.

April 6, 1925 (Monday)
A flight billed as showing the first "in-flight movie" was conducted by Imperial Airways from London to Paris, showing The Lost World. Subsequent research has established that this was actually not the first, as the earliest known in-flight movie has been dated to 1921.
Reporter Robert St. John was severely beaten by several of Al Capone's men after writing a series of exposés about Capone's criminal operations.
Died: Alexandra Kitchin, 60, British model for Lewis Carroll

April 7, 1925 (Tuesday)
Adolf Hitler formally renounced his Austrian citizenship.
The  USS Saratoga aircraft carrier was launched.
Born: Chaturanan Mishra, politician, in Nahar, Madhubani, British India (d. 2011)
Died: Patriarch Tikhon of Moscow, 60, 11th Patriarch of Moscow and all Rus'

April 8, 1925 (Wednesday)
The Australian government and British Colonial Office announced a joint plan to encourage 450,000 British citizens to move to Australia by offering low-interest loans and skills training. 
John D. Price made the first planned night landing on a U.S. aircraft carrier when he landed his TS fighter biplane on the USS Langley.
Died: Frank Stephen Baldwin, 86, American inventor

April 9, 1925 (Thursday)
2 were killed and 11 wounded in Damascus when a demonstration against Lord Balfour near the hotel where he was staying turned into a violent confrontation with police. Arabs resented Balfour's promotion of Jewish interests in Palestine.
Born: Virginia Gibson, dancer, singer and actress, in St. Louis, Missouri (d. 2013); Heinz Nixdorf, computing pioneer and businessman, in Paderborn, Germany (d. 1986)

April 10, 1925 (Friday)
The novel The Great Gatsby by F. Scott Fitzgerald was published.
French Prime Minister Édouard Herriot resigned.
The Russian city of Tsaritsyn was renamed Stalingrad, after Soviet leader Joseph Stalin.
The U.S. Forest Service established Dix National Forest in New Jersey, Eustis, Humphreys and Lee National Forests in Virginia, Meade National Forest in Maryland, Upton National Forest in New York and Tobyhanna National Forest in Pennsylvania.
Lord Balfour hastily left Damascus as Arab protests against him continued.
Born: Angelo Poffo, professional wrestler, in Downer's Grove, Illinois (d. 2010)

April 11, 1925 (Saturday)
Celtic F.C. defeated Dundee, 2 to 1, to win the Scottish Cup of football.

April 12, 1925 (Sunday)
The funeral for Patriarch Tikhon of Moscow was the last major public Orthodox event in the Soviet Union for over sixty years.

April 13, 1925 (Monday)
Abd el-Krim of the Riffians led an attack on French forces in Morocco marking a renewed intensification of the Rif War.
The Dominion of Newfoundland granted women the right to vote.
The Larry Semon-directed version of the film The Wizard of Oz was released.
Died: Elwood Haynes, 67, American inventor

April 14, 1925 (Tuesday)
Tsar Boris III of Bulgaria escaped an assassination attempt when a group of anarchists opened fire on his car as it traveled through the Arabakonak Pass.
Born: Gene Ammons, jazz saxophonist, in Chicago (d. 1974); Rod Steiger, actor, in Westhampton, New York (d. 2002)
Died: John Singer Sargent, 69, American artist

April 15, 1925 (Wednesday)
James Stillman Rockefeller married Nancy Carnegie, grandniece of Andrew Carnegie.
Died: Fritz Haarmann, 45, German serial killer convicted of the murder of 24 boys and young men (beheaded)

April 16, 1925 (Thursday)
A terrorist attack known as the St Nedelya Church assault was carried out in Bulgaria. A group belonging to the Bulgarian Communist Party blew up the roof of the St Nedelya Church in Sofia, killing 150 at a funeral service for General Konstantin Georgiev.
Died: David Powell, 42, Scottish-born actor (pneumonia)

April 17, 1925 (Friday)
Babe Ruth underwent surgery for what the media dubbed "The Bellyache Heard 'Round the World", as the public was informed he'd suffered indigestion after consuming an excess of hot dogs and soda pop. Conflicting accounts exist regarding the true nature of the surgery, but doctors called it "an intestinal abscess".
Paul Painlevé became the New Prime Minister of France.
Born: Art Larsen, tennis player, in Hayward, California (d. 2012)

April 18, 1925 (Saturday)
Rioting broke out in Italian stock exchanges during protests against a new government edict stipulating that 25 percent of the value of all stocks and bonds purchased must be paid for in cash. The law was an attempt to curb speculation to help stabilize the lira.
Born: Bob Hastings, actor, in Brooklyn, New York (d. 2014)

April 19, 1925 (Sunday)
The film The Charmer starring Pola Negri was released.
Born: Hugh O'Brian, actor, in Rochester, New York (d. 2016)
Died: John Walter Smith, 80, American politician

April 20, 1925 (Monday)
Charles Mellor won the 20th Boston Marathon.
Minsky's Burlesque was raided by police in New York as authorities began to crack down on burlesque houses for featuring racy striptease performances. Although a minor incident at the time, it became famous when it was retold in  the 1960 novel The Night They Raided Minsky's, which led to the 1968 musical comedy musical film of the same name.
Born: Ernie Stautner, German-born American football player, in Prinzing near Cham, Bavaria, Germany (d. 2006)

April 21, 1925 (Tuesday)
King Features President Moses Koenigsberg presented a "Phonofilm", made by the company owned by inventor Lee de Forest, to a gathering of editors and publishers in New York City. Shot the week before, Calvin Coolidge became the first U.S. president to talk on film as he delivered a four-minute address.

April 22, 1925 (Wednesday)
The Saltair pavilion, a famous bath house resort in Saltair, Utah, was destroyed by fire.
Born: George Cole, actor, in Morden, South London (d. 2015)
Died: André Caplet, 46, French composer and conductor (pleurisy from being gassed in World War I)

April 23, 1925 (Thursday)
The Italian ocean liner SS Conte Biancamano was launched.
Actress Frances Howard married film producer Samuel Goldwyn.
The Dutch public broadcasting organization Katholieke Radio Omroep was founded.

April 24, 1925 (Friday)
Former German Crown Prince Wilhelm stated that he saw a chance for restoration of the German monarchy in the event of a victory for monarchist candidate Paul von Hindenburg in the April 26 election.
Born: Faye Dancer, baseball player, in Santa Monica, California (d. 2002); Eugen Weber, historian, in Bucharest, Romania (d. 2007)

April 25, 1925 (Saturday)
Sheffield United F.C. defeated Cardiff City 1-0 in the FA Cup Final.
Born: Kay E. Kuter, actor, in Los Angeles (d. 2003)

April 26, 1925 (Sunday)
Paul von Hindenburg won the run-off of the German presidential election. 
Edna Ferber won the Pulitzer Prize for her novel So Big.
Born: Jørgen Ingmann, musician, in Copenhagen, Denmark (d. 2015)

April 27, 1925 (Monday)
Bulgarian authorities claimed they seized 400 pounds of explosives from conspirators plotting to blow up several public buildings in Varna.
The murder of William Plommer occurred in Sheffield, England. The case became international news as a gang of eleven men were arrested and tried.

April 28, 1925 (Tuesday)
Presenting the government's budget, Chancellor of the Exchequer Winston Churchill announced Britain's return to the gold standard. 
The International Exposition of Modern Industrial and Decorative Arts (French: L'Exposition internationale des arts décoratifs et industriels modernes) opened in Paris. The term "Art Deco" was derived by shortening the French title of the exposition, and this show also did much to popularize the style worldwide.
The German comedy film The Found Bride'' premiered in Berlin.

April 29, 1925 (Wednesday)
English inventor Grindell Matthews announced he was putting the finishing touches on his "luminaphone", a machine operated by rays of light that worked like a pipe organ.
Died: Ralph Delahaye Paine, 53, American journalist and author

April 30, 1925 (Thursday)
The first Australian International Motor Show was held in Melbourne.
Born: Johnny Horton, country and rockabilly musician, in Los Angeles (d. 1960)

References

1925
1925-04
1925-04